King fern is a common name for several ferns and may refer to:

Ptisana salicina
Todea barbara, native to southeastern Australia, New Zealand, and South Africa